The Seventh Avenue station (announced as Seventh Avenue-53rd Street) is a station on the IND Sixth Avenue Line and the IND Queens Boulevard Line of the New York City Subway. Located at the intersection of Seventh Avenue and 53rd Street in Manhattan, it is served by the D and E trains at all times, and the B train weekdays.

The Seventh Avenue station was constructed by the Independent Subway System (IND), and it opened on August 19, 1933. The station has two tracks and one island platform on each two levels.  

The station is announced as Seventh Avenue–53rd Street, in the style of other stations that orient east-west along 53rd Street (such as Fifth Avenue/53rd Street and Lexington Avenue–53rd Street), as well as to prevent confusion with Seventh Avenue along the BMT Brighton Line in Brooklyn, which is also served by the B.

History

Planning and opening
The Queens Boulevard Line was one of the first built by the city-owned Independent Subway System (IND), and was planned to stretch between the IND Eighth Avenue Line in Manhattan and 178th Street and Hillside Avenue in Jamaica, Queens, with a stop at Seventh Avenue. The line was first proposed in 1925. Bids for the 53rd Street subway tunnel were received in October 1926, and work started in April 1927. The 53rd Street Tunnel was fully excavated between Queens and Manhattan in January 1929.

The Seventh Avenue station was designed as an interchange point between service of the IND Queens Boulevard Line and the IND Sixth Avenue Line. The northern half of the station opened on August 19, 1933 with the opening of the IND Queens Boulevard Line to Roosevelt Avenue in Queens. The southern half of the station opened on December 15, 1940 with the opening of the IND Sixth Avenue Line north of West Fourth Street to 59th Street–Columbus Circle.

20th century to present
In 1990, Utah tourist Brian Watkins was killed at the Seventh Avenue station while trying to protect his family from a robbery. The murder was described as "probably the tipping point in New York’s history of violence and mayhem", marking a low point in the record murder year of 1990 and leading to an increased police presence in New York. Eight people were indicted: the first trial found four of the eight defendants guilty of murder, and a second trial found three of the remaining four defendants to also be guilty. One defendant was later cleared of murder charges.

In 2019, the Metropolitan Transportation Authority announced that the station would become ADA-accessible as part of the agency's 2020–2024 Capital Program. The announcement occurred after a Connecticut woman fell down a staircase trying to carry her 1-year-old daughter on a stroller down a flight of stairs; the baby survived the fall, but the mother died.

Station layout 

This is a two-level station, with two tracks on each level and two island platforms, one over the other. The lower level serves trains headed railroad north (to Central Park West for trains from the IND Sixth Avenue Line, to Queens for trains from the IND Eighth Avenue Line). The upper level is the reverse, serving trains headed railroad south (toward Lower Manhattan). Each level allows cross-platform interchange between the two lines. The BMT Broadway Line passes overhead near the west end of the station; this crossing is visible in the ceiling and supporting columns.

The station serves two distinct subway lines that do not interconnect. On the IND Sixth Avenue Line, uptown trains (heading west through the station) merge with the IND Eighth Avenue Line along Central Park West, while downtown trains (heading east through the station) run along the IND Sixth Avenue Line. On the IND Queens Boulevard Line, uptown trains (heading east through the station) go to Queens via the 53rd Street Tunnel, while downtown trains (headed west through the station) merge with the Eighth Avenue Line south of 50th Street. There is no way for trains to travel between Central Park West and Queens, or between the Sixth Avenue Line and the lower section of the Eighth Avenue Line. West of the station, the southbound Sixth Avenue Line track (internally labeled as track B3) rises above both Queens Boulevard Line tracks (D3 southbound and D4 northbound), which in turn are above the northbound Sixth Avenue Line track (B4).

Exits
This station has two main exits: one at the westbound end of the station at Broadway, and one in the middle of the station at Broadway. The westbound exit has staircases leading to the northeast and southeast corners of 53rd Street and Broadway. The middle exit has staircases leading to the northeast and southeast corners of 53rd Street and Seventh Avenue.

References

External links 

 
 Station Reporter — B Train
 Station Reporter — D Train
 Station Reporter — E Train
 Seventh Avenue entrance from Google Maps Street View
 Broadway entrance from Google Maps Street View
 Upper platform from Google Maps Street View

IND Sixth Avenue Line stations
IND Queens Boulevard Line stations
1933 establishments in New York City
New York City Subway transfer stations
New York City Subway stations in Manhattan
Railway stations in the United States opened in 1933
Seventh Avenue (Manhattan)
Midtown Manhattan